Jack Crawford defeated Fred Perry 2–6, 6–4, 6–4, 6–4 in the final to win the men's singles tennis title at the 1935 Australian Championships.

Seeds
The seeded players are listed below. Jack Crawford is the champion; others show the round in which they were eliminated.

 Fred Perry (finalist)
 Jack Crawford (champion)
 Roderich Menzel (quarterfinals)
 Christian Boussus (third round)
 Vivian McGrath (semifinals)
 Adrian Quist (semifinals)
 Giorgio de Stefani (quarterfinals)
 Vernon Kirby (second round)

Draw

Key
 Q = Qualifier
 WC = Wild card
 LL = Lucky loser
 r = Retired

Finals

Earlier rounds

Section 1

Section 2

Section 3

Section 4

External links
 

1935
1935 in Australian tennis
Men's Singles